Brendon James Santalab (born 9 September 1982) is an Australian professional football player who plays as a striker for Victorian State League Division 1 side FC Strathmore.

Club career
Santalab originally started out as an apprentice at Parramatta Power before moving to Sydney United under the tutelage of Branko Culina. At the end of the 2003–04 National Soccer League season, he moved to K.V. Oostende in the Belgian First Division. After a brief stint, he moved to another Belgian First Division club, Sint-Truidense V.V. before moving to Hungary for a six-month period with Újpest FC. On 23 June 2007, Santalab was signed by A-League club Sydney FC on a two-year contract, thus reuniting him with Branko Culina.

Santalab made 23 appearances for Sydney FC between 2007 and 2009, scoring four goals. During a game against Adelaide United, Santalab scored a goal from outside the box, that curled into the top corner – a goal that was later ruled the 2007–08 season A-League goal of the year. He scored another goal against Adelaide in the 2008–09 season at the Sydney Football Stadium, when he took a shot from 35 metres out, that slammed into the top corner. Sydney won the match 3–0. His fourth goal came during Sydney's 2–1 upset loss against Perth Glory.

On 14 November 2008, it was announced that Santalab had signed a two-year contract with then-new A-League side the North Queensland Fury for the 2009–10 season. It was announced by North Queensland, that Chinese Super League club Chengdu Blades may make an offer to him, before the start of the season. North Queensland accepted an offer from Chengdu on 21 July. He scored 9 goals during his 12 appearances with the Chengdu Blades.

In 2012, Santalab signed with Chongqing Lifan for one season before signing with the A-League Western Sydney Wanderers.

Santalab scored his first goal for Western Sydney Wanderers in the 7th round of the 2013–14 A-League season, losing to Brisbane Roar 3–1 at Suncorp Stadium.

On 14 May 2014, in the Asian Champions League game against Sanfrecce Hiroshima with 5 minutes to go, Santalab scored the equalising goal that sent Western Sydney Wanderers into the quarter finals of the AFC Champions League.

In the 16th round of the 2014–15 A-League season during a home game at Penrith Stadium against Wellington Phoenix, Santalab scored the second goal in a 2–0 win for his first of the season.

During Santalab's five seasons with the Western Sydney Wanderers he was awarded the Western Sydney Wanderers Player of the Year in the 2016/17 and received two of the Club's Golden Boot Awards in 2015/16 and 2016/17. He is also the Western Sydney Wanderers highest goal scorer of all time.

In June 2018, Santalab signed a one-year deal with Perth Glory, reuniting with former coach and mentor, Tony Popovic. Santalab won the minor premiership with the Glory, but missed a penalty in the shoot-out in the 2019 A-League Grand Final and subsequently lost the final.

In May 2019, Santalab signed for semi-professional side Dandenong City who compete in the National Premier Leagues Victoria. When he joined City, they were in 13th place. Santalab ended the season with 8 goals in 13 games, propelling the club to 7th place.

In September 2019, Caroline Springs George Cross FC announced that Santalab would be joining the club for the 2020 season, also appointing him as the "Commercial & Football Sales Manager".

Honours

Club
Western Sydney Wanderers
AFC Champions League: 2014

Perth Glory
 A-League: Premiers 2018–19

Individual
Western Sydney Wanderers Golden Boot Winner 2015–16 
Western Sydney Wanderers Player of the Year: 2016–17
Western Sydney Wanderers Golden Boot Winner 2016–17

References

External links
Brendon Santalab's Official Website
Brendon Santalab writes on PlayersVoice
Brendon Santalab at Aussie Footballers

Living people
1982 births
Sportspeople from Wollongong
Association football wingers
Association football forwards
Australian soccer players
Australian people of Croatian descent
A-League Men players
Western Sydney Wanderers FC players
Australian expatriate soccer players
National Soccer League (Australia) players
Expatriate footballers in Singapore
Belgian Pro League players
Sint-Truidense V.V. players
Northern Fury FC players
Parramatta Power players
Sydney FC players
Sydney United 58 FC players
Újpest FC players
Perth Glory FC players
Australian expatriate sportspeople in China
Chengdu Tiancheng F.C. players
Chongqing Liangjiang Athletic F.C. players
Expatriate footballers in China
Geylang International FC players
Singapore Premier League players
Chinese Super League players
China League One players
Caroline Springs George Cross FC players